Italy competed at the 2020 Winter Youth Olympics in Lausanne, Switzerland from 9 to 22 January 2020.

Medalists
Medals awarded to participants of mixed-NOC teams are represented in italics. These medals are not counted towards the individual NOC medal tally.

Alpine skiing

Boys

Girls

Biathlon

Boys

Girls

Mixed

Curling

Italy qualified a mixed team of four athletes.

Mixed team

Mixed doubles

Figure skating

Five Italian figure skaters achieved quota places for Italy based on the results of the 2019 World Junior Figure Skating Championships.

Singles

Couples

Ice hockey

Short track speed skating

Two Italian skaters achieved quota places for Italy based on the results of the 2019 World Junior Short Track Speed Skating Championships.

Boys

Girls

Speed skating

One Italian skaters achieved quota places for Italy based on the results of the 2019 World Junior Speed Skating Championships.

Boys

See also
Italy at the 2020 Summer Olympics

References

2020 in Italian sport
Nations at the 2020 Winter Youth Olympics
Italy at the Youth Olympics